Kyle Koehler (born October 5, 1961) represented Ohio's 79th district in the Ohio House of Representatives from January 2015 to December of 2023. 

Due to term limits, Koehler was replaced by Colonel Bernard Willis in January 2023. 

Koehler (pronounced "kay-ler") was born and raised in Springfield, Ohio, attended Springfield's Catholic Central High School and then Wright State University.  He and his family own a small business in Springfield.  

In 2014, Koehler opted to make his first run for elected office, and decided to run for the Ohio House of Representatives to replace Ross McGregor who was term-limited. He faced Democrat Darryl Jackson in a competitive seat. Koehler went on to defeat Jackson 61%-39%.

In 2016, Koehler faced a challenge from Democrat Alex Wendt. Koehler won re-election in another 61%-39% victory.

In 2018, Koehler faced a challenge from Democrat Amanda Finfrock. Koehler won the 2018 general election by 19% in a 59.5%-40.5% victory.

In 2020, Koehler faced Cynthia Richards in his last campaign for State Representative (due to term-limits). Koehler won the 2020 general election by 26% in a 63.1%-36.9% victory.

Koehler won each of his general elections in 2014, 2016, 2018, and 2020 by margins of 22%, 22%, 19%, and 26% points respectively in a district that is considered a 50-50 district for Presidential Elections.

Representative Koehler chaired the Ohio House Agriculture and Rural Development Committee during the 133rd and 134th General Assemblies.

Career
Kyle Koehler received his bachelor's degree from Wright State University in computer science. He spent seven years leading teams developing classified software surrounding signal analysis and data acquisition for government contractors.

Along with his duties in the House, Koehler is Vice President of K.K. Tool Co. Inc. Koehler has used his extensive knowledge in computer technology to design and develop dies, fixtures and robotic weld fixtures using Solidworks 3D modeling software over the last 30 years.

Marriage and family life
Kyle Koehler married Kathrin (Eimer) Koehler in July 1988. Kathrin Koehler, who is a licensed psychologist in the State of Ohio, worked as an independent counselor until taking a break to home educate their five children starting in 1999.

The Koehlers have five adult children.

Payday Lending
Representative Koehler, along with Rep. Mike Ashford (D), spent the 132nd General Assembly fighting to bring reform to the payday lending industry in Ohio. Fighting for well over 13 months for movement on House Bill 123, Koehler successfully moved the bill out of Government Accountability and Oversight in April 2018. The Ohio House passed the bill on June 7 with a 71-17 bipartisan vote.

The bill spent four weeks in the Ohio Senate, where Senate Finance Chair, Scott Oelslager introduced Substitute House Bill 123. The Substitute House Bill, kept the structure of the original bill introduced by Reps Koehler and Ashford; but made adjustments to the fees and loan limits.  Senate Finance and the full Senate passed SUB HB123 on July 10.

The Ohio House concurred on the Senate changes on July 24 after a furious floor debate. Governor John Kasich signed the bill six days later on July 30.

The Fresh Start Act
Representative Koehler, introduced The Fresh Start Act (Ohio House Bill 263) in the 133rd General Assembly. The bill cleaned up over 800 pages of the Ohio Revised Code in dealing with Occupational Licensing in Ohio. The original bill restricted Occupational Licensing Boards from looking back more than five years on convictions and jail time for those seeing occupational licenses (everything from hairdressers to landscaping, engineers to nurses).  The bill excluded any convinces for crimes that were violent or sexual in nature.

It passed out of the Ohio House (90-1) and was amended in the Senate to exclude fiduciary licenses and licenses to those dealing with the aged. The House unanimously concurred on the changes and the bill was signed into law by the Governor in early 2021.

“Nearly one in five Ohioans needs an occupational license to do their job,” Koehler said. “The Fresh Start Act is a comprehensive occupational licensing and criminal justice reform proposal that will assist Ohioans who have paid their debt to society and deserve more than to be treated as second-class citizens for the rest of their lives.”

Duty To Retreat
In the lame duck session of the 133rd General Assembly, Representative Koehler made the move to amend Senate Bill 175 (R-Schaffer) with language to remove the Duty To Retreat from the Ohio Revised Code. This provision applies to a person located anywhere he is lawfully allowed to be (and not an aggressor in a confrontation) where they believe they are in immediate danger of bodily harm or death.  The clarification has been debated for over 10 years in the Ohio Legislature.

Koehler worked closely with Senate President Larry Obhof and Speaker Bob Cupp (as well as the bill sponsor) to successfully get the Governor to sign amended Senate Bill 175 into law on January 4, 2021.

"In 2018, then gubernatorial candidate Mike DeWine promised the Buckeye Firearms Association at his campaign headquarters in Columbus that he would sign Stand Your Ground legislation. We sent him the most simple and straightforward repeal of Duty To Retreat. Senate Bill 175 provides this simple fix that will protect law-abiding gun owners," Koehler wrote in a statement following DeWine's signature.

Committees
Rep. Koehler has, once again, been named Chairman of the Ohio House Agriculture and Rural Development Committee for the 134th General Assembly. This will be his fourth term serving on this committee. He is also returning for his fourth term to the Ohio House Primary and Secondary Education Committee (formerly the Education Committee). In his final term, Chairman Koehler will also serve on the newly formed Technology and Innovation Committee.

In the 132nd General Assembly, Koehler served as Vice-Chair of Agriculture and Rural Development as well as on Education & Career Readiness. He was assigned to the newly formed Federalism & Interstate Relations Committee that focused on State's Rights issues including a number of gun bills.

In his first term in the 131st General Assembly, Representative Koehler served on the following committees: Agriculture and Rural Development, Economic & Workforce Development, and Education.

Koehler served on the Straight-A-Fund Governing Board as one of three appointed legislators on the eight member board.

Representative Koehler was appointed to the 21 member board of the Ohio Family Stability Commission.

As the Chair of the Ohio House Agriculture Committee, Koehler also was automatically appointed to the Ohio Expo Commission.

Electoral history

References

Links
official campaign site
Facebook page
Twitter

1961 births
Living people
Republican Party members of the Ohio House of Representatives
Wright State University alumni
Politicians from Springfield, Ohio
American business executives
21st-century American politicians